Pyjama Party is a Finnish sketch comedy television series starring Niina Lahtinen, Pirjo Heikkilä, Sanna Stellan, Krisse Salminen, Joonas Nordman and Jarkko Niemi. Pyjama Party is scripted by the director Anna Dahlman with the actresses and composed by Katja Lappi.

The first season aired in Finland in 2014 and the second season in 2015. TV-series is produced by Yellow Film & TV and aired by Yle.

Pyjama Party is an unruly and sassy sketch comedy show with full of music, entertainment, personal accounts of the comedians’ private lives and weird performances such as awkward wedding speeches and clumsy lap dances. Every episode deals with a different type of theme e.g. Relationship (season 1 episode 2), Home (season 1 episode 3), Work (season 1 episode 4) or Sex (season 1 episode 5). Pyjama Party's sketch Booze day which shows parents behaving like little children in a liquor store became an international YouTube hit in 2015. It also received the annual award for promoting temperance in 2015.

Awards
Pyjama Party won Kultainen Venla Award for the best comedy and sketch program in 2014 and 2015. Pyjama Party was also selected for a nominee of The Best Comedy Show in Rose d'Or Awards 2016.

References

External links

Finnish television sketch shows
2014 Finnish television series debuts
2016 Finnish television series endings
Yle original programming